The 2006 women's road cycling season was the seventh season for the  Vrienden van het Platteland (UCI code: VVP) cycling team, which began as Ondernemers van Nature in 2000.

One of the main new recruits for the team was former junior rider Ellen van Dijk. In March Ellen van Dijk became University World Champion at the 2006 World University Cycling Championship in the women's road race. and finished second in the women's time trial. The other main victories for the team were Flèche Hesbignonne by Chantal Beltman and stage 2 of the Tour Féminin en Limousin by Ellen van Dijk. At the national championships Sharon van Essen finished second in the road race and Iris Slappendel won the bronze medal in the women's time trial. At the end of the year the team ended 12th in the UCI Team's Ranking with Chantal Beltman as the best individual at the 30th place in the UCI Individual Women's Road Ranking. Van Dijk was also active on the track and won the bronze medal at the 2006 Dutch National Track Championships in the women's individual pursuit.

Roster

Ages as of 1 January 2006.

Sources

Riders who joined the team for the 2006 season

Riders who left the team during or after the 2005 season

Results

Season victories

Results in major races

UCI World Ranking

The team finished 12th in the UCI ranking for teams.

References

2006 UCI Women's Teams seasons
2006 in Dutch sport
Vrienden van het Platteland